In anatomy and physiology, a duct is a circumscribed channel leading from an exocrine gland or organ.

Types of ducts
Examples include:

Duct system
As ducts travel from the acinus which generates the fluid to the target, the ducts become larger and the epithelium becomes thicker. The parts of the system are classified as follows:

Some sources consider "lobar" ducts to be the same as "interlobar ducts", while others consider lobar ducts to be larger and more distal from the acinus. For sources that make the distinction, the interlobar ducts are more likely to classified with simple columnar epithelium (or pseudostratified epithelium), reserving the stratified columnar for the lobar ducts.

Intercalated duct

The intercalated duct, also called intercalary duct (ducts of Boll), is the portion of an exocrine gland leading directly from the acinus to a striated duct. The intercalated duct forms part of the intralobular duct. This duct has the thinnest epithelium of any part of the duct system, and the epithelium is usually classified as "low" simple cuboidal.

They are found in both the pancreas and in salivary glands.

Striated duct

A striated duct (Pflüger's ducts ) is a gland duct which connects an intercalated duct to an interlobular duct. It is characterized by the basal infoldings of its plasma membrane, characteristic of ion-pumping activity by the numerous mitochondria. Along with the intercalated ducts, they function to modify salivary fluid by secreting HCO3− and K+ and reabsorbing Na+ and Cl− using the Na-K pump and the Cl-HCO3 pump, making the saliva hypotonic.

Their epithelium can be simple cuboidal or simple columnar.

Striated ducts are part of the intralobular ducts.

They are found in the submandibular gland, sublingual duct, and the parotid gland, but are more developed in the parotid gland.

They are not present in pancreas.

Intralobular duct
An intralobular duct is the portion of an exocrine gland inside a lobule, leading directly from acinus to an interlobular duct (between lobules). It is composed of two subdivisions, the intercalated duct and the striated duct.

In the human mammary gland, the intralobular duct is a part of the glandular system that resides within the lobules. Lobules contain clusters of ducts whose secretory alveolies are drained by the intralobular duct. The intralobular ducts are usually lined with simple cuboidal epithelial cells that are lined by myoepithelial cells as well.

The intralobular ducts of the lobules drain into the interlobular ducts between lobules.

They can be seen in: 
 pancreas
 salivary glands

See also
 Ductal carcinoma
 Endocrine gland

References

External links
 Overview at uwa.edu.au
 Overview at siumed.edu

Glands